Johan Johannson may refer to:

Johan Johannson (1881–1958), Norwegian businessman
Johan Johannson (1911–2004), Norwegian businessman
Johan Johannson (1967) (born 1967), Norwegian businessman
Jóhann Jóhannsson (1969-2018), Icelandic composer